Serge Nicolas is a French professor of psychology at the Institute of Psychology of the University of Paris since 2003. He specializes in the study of memory and history of psychology. He is also chief-editor of the journal L'Année psychologique, and a distinguished member of the Institut Universitaire de France since 2016.

Career 
Nicolas earned his doctorate in psychology in 1992, on a thesis titled "Memory and its manifestations: from its implicit expression to its explicit actualization" (supervised by Guy Tiberghien) and became associate professor the same year at the University of Paris. He became full professor there in 2003, and earned a second PhD in philosophy in 2007 from the Université Paris VIII, on a thesis titled "Academic philosophy in France from the Revolution to the Restauration (1789-1830): History of the foundation of a political philosophy based on psychology" (supervised by Patrice Vermeren). 

Nicolas' research focuses primarily on cognitive psychology, with a particular interest in memory, as well as on the history of psychology, with several hundred publications on these topics. Beyond the publication, translation, and re-edition of academic books, Nicolas is also the curator of the psychology museum at the Institute of Psychology of the University of Paris, organizing exhibitions in which he showcases private as well as the University's historical pieces.

His editorial positions include the directorship of the peer-reviewed academic journal L'Année psychologique, as well as of the Psychological Encyclopedia at L'Harmattan.

He is currently a member of the Memory and Cognition Lab at the Institute of Psychology of the University of Paris.

Selected bibliography 

Serge Nicolas is the author of several books, including:

 Histoire de la psychologie, Dunod, 2001
 Mémoire et conscience, Armand Colin, 2003
 La psychologie cognitive, Armand Colin, 2003
 Les maladies de la mémoire, In Press, 2007
 	Histoire de la psychologie scientifique, De Boeck, 2008
 Introduction à la psychologie cognitive, In Press, 2009
 Études d'histoire de la psychologie, L'Harmattan, 2009

References 

Living people
Paris 8 University Vincennes-Saint-Denis alumni
French psychologists
1962 births
Academic staff of the University of Paris
21st-century French male writers
Scientists from Paris
Cognitive psychologists
Psychology journal editors